Rafaello Oliveira Ferreira (born January 26, 1982) is a Brazilian mixed martial artist who formerly competed in the lightweight division of the Ultimate Fighting Championship.

Mixed martial arts career 
Oliveria took up Brazilian Jiu-Jitsu at the age of 16, and started his professional MMA career in 2004, competing in his native Brazil. He moved to the United States in 2007, and settled in Knoxville, Tennessee, in 2008, where he was an instructor at the Knoxville Martial Arts Academy. In 2012 he moved to Charleston, SC where he taught at Charleston Krav Maga and now teaches out of Pro Performance Athletics in Mt. Pleasant, SC.

Ultimate Fighting Championship

In August 2009, it was announced Oliveira would be debuting for the Ultimate Fighting Championship at UFC 103. He was originally scheduled to fight Dan Lauzon, but Lauzon pulled out of the bout due to an injury and was replaced by Nik Lentz. Despite pushing the pace in the first round and moving forward aggressively, Oliveira was controlled by Lentz in the 2nd and 3rd rounds which led to a unanimous decision loss.

Oliveira was expected to face Sean Sherk on January 2, 2010, at UFC 108. However, after an injury to Tyson Griffin, Sherk stepped up to face Jim Miller, leaving Oliveira to face John Gunderson. Oliveira went on to defeat Gunderson via unanimous decision, earning his first UFC win.

Oliveria most recently faced Andre Winner on March 31, 2010, at UFC Fight Night 21, replacing an injured Cole Miller. Oliveira was defeated by Winner via unanimous decision and was subsequently released from the UFC.

In May 2011, Oliveira was re-signed by the UFC and faced Gleison Tibau on May 28, 2011, at UFC 130, replacing an injured Bart Palaszewski. Oliveira was submitted for the second time in his professional career, tapping out to a rear-naked choke in the second round.

Oliveira faced Yves Edwards on October 1, 2011, at UFC on Versus 6. He lost the fight via TKO in the second round.

Oliveira was expected to face Reza Madadi on January 20, 2012, at UFC on FX 1.  However, Oliveira was forced out of a bout with an injury and replaced by returning veteran Fabrício Camões.

Oliveira faced Yoislandy Izquierdo on July 7, 2012, at UFC 148. He won the fight via unanimous decision.

Oliveira was expected to face Michael Chiesa on December 8, 2012, at UFC on Fox 5.  However, Oliveira was forced out of the bout with a broken hand and replaced by Marcus LeVesseur.

Oliveira faced Edson Barboza at UFC 162, and lost the bout due to leg kicks in the second round.

Oliveira faced Erik Koch on February 22, 2014, at UFC 170. He lost the fight by TKO in the first round after he was knocked down by a counter straight right hook, and was subsequently released from UFC shortly after.

Personal life
Oliveira is married to Wanessa Carolina and has three children.

Mixed martial arts record

|-
| Loss
| align=center| 17–8
| Erik Koch
| TKO (punches)
| UFC 170
| 
| align=center| 1
| align=center| 1:24
| Las Vegas, Nevada, United States
| 
|-
| Loss
| align=center| 17–7
| Edson Barboza
| TKO (leg kicks)
| UFC 162
| 
| align=center| 2
| align=center| 1:44
| Las Vegas, Nevada, United States
| 
|-
| Win
| align=center| 17–6
| Yoislandy Izquierdo
| Decision (unanimous)
| UFC 148
| 
| align=center| 3
| align=center| 5:00
| Las Vegas, Nevada, United States
| 
|-
| Loss
| align=center| 16–6
| Yves Edwards
| TKO (head kick and punches)
| UFC Live: Cruz vs. Johnson
| 
| align=center| 2
| align=center| 2:44
| Washington, D.C., United States
| 
|-
| Loss
| align=center| 16–5
| Gleison Tibau
| Submission (rear-naked choke)
| UFC 130
| 
| align=center| 2
| align=center| 3:28
| Las Vegas, Nevada, United States
| 
|-
| Win
| align=center| 16–4
| Ryan Bixler
| TKO (punches)
| Recife Fighting Championship 4
| 
| align=center| 2
| align=center| 0:21
| Recife, Brazil
| 
|-
| Win
| align=center| 15–4
| Bendy Casimir
| Decision (unanimous)
| Recife Fighting Championship 3
| 
| align=center| 3
| align=center| 5:00
| Recife, Brazil
| 
|-
| Win
| align=center| 14–4
| Kevin Roddy
| Submission (rear-naked choke) 
| DFL 1: The Big Bang
| 
| align=center| 1
| align=center| 4:46
| New Jersey, United States, United States
| 
|-
| Win
| align=center| 13–4
| Rafael Dias
| Decision (unanimous)
| Scorpius Fighting Championships 1
| 
| align=center| 3
| align=center| 5:00
| Fort Lauderdale, Florida, United States
| 
|-
| Loss
| align=center| 12–4
| Andre Winner
| Decision (unanimous)
| UFC Fight Night: Florian vs. Gomi
| 
| align=center| 3
| align=center| 5:00
| Charlotte, North Carolina, United States
| 
|-
| Win
| align=center| 12–3
| John Gunderson
| Decision (unanimous)
| UFC 108
| 
| align=center| 3
| align=center| 5:00
| Las Vegas, Nevada, United States
| 
|-
| Loss
| align=center| 11–3
| Nik Lentz
| Decision (unanimous)
| UFC 103
| 
| align=center| 3
| align=center| 5:00
| Dallas, Texas, United States
| 
|-
| Win
| align=center| 11–2
| John Mahlow
| Decision (unanimous)
| XFC 8: Regional Conflict
| 
| align=center| 3
| align=center| 5:00
| Knoxville, Tennessee, United States
| 
|-
|  Win
| align=center| 10–2
| Beau King
| Submission (rear-naked choke)
| Colosseo Championship Fighting
| 
| align=center| 1
| align=center| 1:34
| Edmonton, Alberta, Canada
| 
|-
|  Win
| align=center| 9–2
| Robert Thompson
| Submission (triangle choke)
| XFC 7: School of Hard Knox
| 
| align=center| 1
| align=center| 4:50
| Knoxville, Tennessee, United States
| 
|-
|  Loss
| align=center| 8–2
| Lyle Beerbohm
| TKO (doctor stoppage)
| ShoXC 9
| 
| align=center| 1
| align=center| 5:00
| Hammond, Indiana, United States
| 
|-
|  Win
| align=center| 8–1
| David Santiago
| N/A
| ROTR: Beatdown 6
| 
| align=center| N/A
| align=center| N/A
| Hawaii, United States
| 
|-
|  Win
| align=center| 7–1
| Edilson Florencio
| Submission (triangle choke)
| MZI - Combat 2
| 
| align=center| N/A
| align=center| N/A
| Caicó, Rio Grande do Norte, Brazil
| 
|-
|  Win
| align=center| 6–1
| Vitor Pimenta
| TKO (punches)
| Action Fight Championship
| 
| align=center| 2
| align=center| N/A
| Pernambuco, Brazil
| 
|-
|  Win
| align=center| 5–1
| Weguimar de Lucena Xavier
| TKO (slam)
| Rino's FC 2
| 
| align=center| 1
| align=center| N/A
| Pernambuco, Brazil
| 
|-
|  Win
| align=center| 4–1
| Fabio Santana Toldo
| Submission (rear-naked choke)
| Rino's FC 1
| 
| align=center| 1
| align=center| N/A
| Pernambuco, Brazil
| 
|-
|  Win
| align=center| 3–1
| Miro Arona
| Decision (unanimous)
| Pernambuco Extreme Fight
| 
| align=center| 2
| align=center| 5:00
| Pernambuco, Brazil
| 
|-
|  Loss
| align=center| 2–1
| Jorge Rodrigues Silva
| Submission (keylock)
| Pernambuco Extreme Fight
| 
| align=center| 1
| align=center| N/A
| Pernambuco, Brazil
| 
|-
|  Win
| align=center| 2–0
| Unknown Fighter
| N/A
| Pernambuco Extreme Fight
| 
| align=center| N/A
| align=center| N/A
| Pernambuco, Brazil
| 
|-
|  Win
| align=center| 1–0
| Weguimar de Lucena Xavier
| TKO (punches)
| Arena Fight
| 
| align=center| 2
| align=center| N/A
| Pernambuco, Brazil
|

References

External links
Official UFC Profile

1982 births
Brazilian male mixed martial artists
Lightweight mixed martial artists
Mixed martial artists utilizing Brazilian jiu-jitsu
Brazilian expatriate sportspeople in the United States
Living people
Sportspeople from Recife
Brazilian practitioners of Brazilian jiu-jitsu
People awarded a black belt in Brazilian jiu-jitsu
Ultimate Fighting Championship male fighters